The London Labour Party mayoral selection of 2010 was the process by which the Labour Party selected its candidate for Mayor of London, to stand in the 2012 mayoral election. Ken Livingstone, former Mayor of London, was selected to stand.

Selection process

The Labour Party candidate for Mayor was elected by an electoral college composed half-and-half of the votes of Labour members in London and the votes of affiliated organisations. The ballot papers were issued around early September 2010, and the winner was announced on 24 September.

Candidates

Ken Livingstone, Mayor of London 2000-2008; Leader of the Greater London Council 1981-1986; Member of Parliament for Brent East 1987–2001.
Oona King, Member of Parliament for Bethnal Green and Bow 1997–2005.

Result

Source: http://privatewww.essex.ac.uk/~tquinn/london_mayoralty.htm

See also
2012 London mayoral election

References

External links
London Labour Party website

London Labour Party
Mayoral elections in London
Labour Party mayoral selection
London Labour Party mayoral selection
London Labour Party mayoral selection
Ken Livingstone